Francis Hutchinson (1660–1739) was Bishop of Down and Connor and opponent of witch-hunting.

Francis Hutchinson may also refer to:

Francis Hutchinson (physician) (1870–1931), British physician
Sir Francis Hutchinson, 1st Baronet, Irish politician
Francis Hutchinson (priest), Anglican priest in Ireland
Francis Ernest Hutchinson, English literary scholar and Anglican clergyman
F. W. Hutchinson (Francis William Hutchinson, 1910–1990), engineer
Francis Hutchinson, co-founding member in the 1820s of a group that became the Plymouth Brethren, see John Nelson Darby

See also
Francis Hely-Hutchinson (1769–1827), Irish politician
Francis Hutcheson (disambiguation)